The Commonwealth Rowing Championships are a regatta for rowers from Commonwealth nations held in conjunction with the Commonwealth Games.  Rowing is classed as an 'optional' sport for the purposes of the Commonwealth Games, but is currently not included in the Commonwealth Games programme itself. The Championships are therefore usually held immediately after or before the Games themselves in the same host city, or nearby. They are a recognised championships  by the Commonwealth Games Federation, and the Federation provides the medals for the victors.

History

In 1994 and 1999 the Commonwealth Rowing Association organised a Commonwealth Rowing Regatta at Fanshawe Lake, London, Ontario, Canada.

In August 2002 the first official Commonwealth Rowing Championships were held in Holme Pierrepont, Nottingham, England, and the 2006 Championships were held at Strathclyde Park, Motherwell, Scotland.

The 2010 Championships were held on 31 July and 1 August at Welland, Ontario, Canada.

In August 2014 the Championships were held, on a 1500-metre course, again at Strathclyde Park, Motherwell, Scotland.

In 2018 there was a Commonwealth Beach Sprint Championships at Sandbanks, Poole, England on 17-18 August.

2002 participating nations and medal count 

This is the full table of the medal count of the first Commonwealth Rowing Championships. These rankings sort by the number of gold medals earned by a country. The number of silvers is taken into consideration next and then the number of bronze. If, after the above, countries are still tied, equal ranking is given and they are listed alphabetically. This follows the system used by the IOC, IAAF and BBC.

2006 participating nations and medal count 

The second Commonwealth Rowing Championships were held in August 2006 at Strathclyde Park, Motherwell, Scotland.

2010 participating nations and medal count 

The third Commonwealth Rowing Championships were held in July & August 2010 at Welland, Ontario, Canada.

2014 participating nations and medal count 

The fourth Commonwealth Rowing Championships were held in August 2014, on a 1500-metre course, at Strathclyde Park, Motherwell, Scotland.

2018 participating nations and medal count 

The fifth edition of Commonwealth Rowing Championships was in the form of the Commonwealth Beach Sprint Regatta at Sandbanks, Poole, England in August 2018.

2022 participating nations and medal count 

The sixth edition of the Commonwealth Rowing Championships was in the form of the Commonwealth Rowing Association Beach Sprint Championships at Independence Beach, Walvis Bay, Namibia in December 2022. 

This marks the first time the event has been held in Africa.

All-time medal table

References

Rowing at the Commonwealth Games
Rowing